Gary Anthony Sturgis is an American actor, musician, writer, teacher and entrepreneur, known for his role as Bar Patron and other characters in the television series America's Most Wanted, and for providing the voice of Ebon in the animated series Static Shock.

Sturgis is also known by the rap moniker of Illuminati, having successfully promoted a few albums on iTunes.

Early life 
Sturgis was born in New Orleans, Louisiana, and is the second oldest son of four born to Abraham and Sarah Sturgis. He grew up in the Ninth Ward of New Orleans, Louisiana, and attended McDonogh Senior High School where he played piccolo and served as drum major for the band. After writing an essay for a class assignment expressing his love and desire for acting, a teacher invited him to a table read for a play, and Sturgis was cast as the understudy; later going on to play the lead role of A Raisin in the Sun.

Career 
Sturgis made his acting debut in the romantic thriller film The Big Easy (1986). He later starred in the film Blaze (1989) as Marquez' Son.

Sturgis later appeared as an antagonist in two of Tyler Perry's movies, Diary of a Mad Black Woman (2005) and Daddy's Little Girls (2007), as well as the movie Pride (2007), starring Terrence Howard, and co-stars in the independent feature directed by Cedric the Entertainer, Chicago Pulaski Jones. He has also landed television roles in his early career such as a recurring character by the name of Caz in the General Hospital spin-off, Port Charles, as well as smaller roles on The District, NYPD Blue, Malcolm and Eddie and Girlfriends.

In the mid 1990s, he began booking voice-over jobs in commercials and trailers. He served as the voice of the Monday night (and later Tuesday night) lineup on the now defunct UPN network, promoting such series as The Parkers, Moesha, Half & Half, Girlfriends, The Hughleys and many others. Simultaneously in 1997 and 1998, he was also the daily announcer for the late night talk show, VIBE, starring Chris Spencer and later, comedian Sinbad. Sturgis never had a contract for either job stating that he would just "keep coming everyday until they tell me to stop." This lasted for the duration of the network and the talk show respectively.

Sturgis appeared on the cover of The Hollywood Reporter in 2002 in celebration of his voice over efforts. In addition to promos for network television, he also did several Hollywood movie trailers such as Bones, The Wood, Crossroads, Two Can Play That Game and The Others.

Gary was interviewed by fashion editor Antoine Von Boozier exclusively for Floss Magazine that was published on March 7, 2016. During the interview, Gary reveals he is venturing more into producing and directing the many screenplays and television series he have penned over the years. Sturgis says “I am currently in editing on my directorial debut in 2016, and shooting CainAbel a film I star in as well as HOWARD HIGH, a new musical offering from Chris Stokes. I appreciate all the love and support from my fans!”

He played several animated roles landing himself in cartoons, feature films and in video games. A partial list includes, Static Shock, Avatar: The Last Airbender, Scooby-Doo and the Cyber Chase, Batman Beyond, Batman: The Brave and the Bold and The Fairly OddParents: Wishology. Video game titles include Shout About Music, True Crime: New York City, Evil Dead, Spider-Man 2 and Red Faction. His role in Batman: The Brave and the Bold as the DC Comics anti-hero Bronze Tiger was also reprised in the PlayStation Vita and Nintendo 3DS video game Batman: Arkham Origins Blackgate.

In February 2009, he worked on Blokhedz animated web series on Missiong.com and did the voice of Biskit, the leader of the biker gang Wild Dawgs.

In October 2008, Sturgis began working as a staff writer for Tyler Perry Studios on the series Tyler Perry's House of Payne and Meet the Browns, both on TBS. This would mark his first professional writing job. His first credited episode of Tyler Perry's House of Payne aired on December 16, 2008.

Outside of acting, Sturgis also works as a musician, writer, teacher and entrepreneur.

Filmography

Film

Television

Video games

Web

References

External links 

 

Living people
American male film actors
American male voice actors
African-American male actors
Male actors from New Orleans
American male writers
American directors
American producers
American male musicians
1966 births
21st-century African-American people
20th-century African-American people